The 2001 Pop Secret Microwave Popcorn 400 was the 33rd stock car race of the 2001 NASCAR Winston Cup Series and the 27th iteration of the event. The race was held on Sunday, November 4, 2001, in Rockingham, North Carolina, at North Carolina Speedway, a  permanent high-banked racetrack. The race took the scheduled 393 laps to complete. At race's end, Joe Nemechek, driving for Andy Petree Racing, would manage to dominate the late stages of the race to win his second career NASCAR Winston Cup Series victory and his only victory of the season. To fill out the podium, Kenny Wallace, driving for Dale Earnhardt, Inc., and Johnny Benson Jr., driving for MBV Motorsports, would finish second and third, respectively.

Background 
North Carolina Speedway was opened as a flat, one-mile oval on October 31, 1965. In 1969, the track was extensively reconfigured to a high-banked, D-shaped oval just over one mile in length. In 1997, North Carolina Motor Speedway merged with Penske Motorsports, and was renamed North Carolina Speedway. Shortly thereafter, the infield was reconfigured, and competition on the infield road course, mostly by the SCCA, was discontinued. Currently, the track is home to the Fast Track High Performance Driving School.

Entry list 

 (R) denotes rookie driver.

Practice

First practice 
The first practice session was held on Friday, November 2, at 11:20 AM EST. The session would last for two hours.

Second practice 
The second session was held on Saturday, November 3, at 10:15 AM EST. The session would last for 45 minutes.

Third and final practice 
The final practice session, sometimes referred to as Happy Hour, was held on Saturday, November 3, at 12:00 PM EST. The session would last for 45 minutes.

Qualifying 
Qualifying was held on Friday, November 2, at 3:05 PM EST. Each driver would have two laps to set a fastest time; the fastest of the two would count as their official qualifying lap. Positions 1-36 would be decided on time, while positions 37-43 would be based on provisionals. Six spots are awarded by the use of provisionals based on owner's points. The seventh is awarded to a past champion who has not otherwise qualified for the race. If no past champ needs the provisional, the next team in the owner points will be awarded a provisional.

Rick Mast was the only driver to fail to qualify.

Full qualifying results 

*Time not available.

Race results

References 

2001 NASCAR Winston Cup Series
NASCAR races at Rockingham Speedway
November 2001 sports events in the United States
2001 in sports in North Carolina